Michael A. Benjamin (born May 2, 1958) represented District 79 in the New York State Assembly, which includes Morrisania, Crotona Park East, and East Tremont, until December 31, 2010. The seat is currently held by Michael Blake.

Chosen in a special election in 2003, Benjamin is a member of the Election Law Committee. A former member of the Bronx Board of Elections and Deputy Chief of the Board of Elections, he sponsored the Campaign Financing Reform Act of 2005.

Prior to his election to the Assembly Benjamin served as a member of local community boards within the Bronx and ran unsuccessfully against City Councilwoman Helen Foster.

Challengers in the 2006 primary were Wilbert Tee Lawton-a district leader-and Sigfredo Gonzalez.

Benjamin holds a B.A.in Political Science from Syracuse University.

Benjamin retired from the State Assembly on December 31, 2010. He now works as a columnist and public affairs consultant.

External links
Bronx Official Is Nominated For Assembly
Benjamin's response to the 2008 Candidate Questionnaire for State Senate and Assembly from the 504 Democratic Club of New York City

References

1958 births
Living people
Politicians from the Bronx
Syracuse University alumni
Democratic Party members of the New York State Assembly
21st-century American politicians